The first expedition of Bashir ibn Sad al-Anṣari (بشير بن سعد الأنصاري), which was to Fadak, took place in Shaban, 7AH i.e. December 628 AD, 3rd Month 7AH, of the Islamic Calendar.

30 men with Bashir bin Sad Al-Ansari as the commander, headed to Fadak to confront the Banu Murrah in Sha'aban. Bashir and his men killed a large number of the enemy and seized a lot of their camels and cattle, Bashir drove off the camels and flocks. On his way back, the enemy gathered up forces and overtook the Muslims at night. They showered Basheer and his men with arrows, and killed all the Muslims except Bashir. Bashir managed to escape back to Muhammad.

See also
Military career of Muhammad
List of expeditions of Muhammad

Notes

628
Campaigns ordered by Muhammad